Polatlı railway station is a railway station in Polatlı. Polatlı is on the İstanbul-Ankara Main Line, with intercity rail services to many cities around Turkey. The station was built opened in 1892 by the Anatolian Railway.

16 intercity trains running between İstanbul and Ankara service the station. 6 of the 16 trains run past Ankara towards eastern Turkey. 4 trains between İzmir and Ankara service the station along with a regional train to Ankara.

Yüksek Hızlı Tren high-speed rail trains between Eskişehir and Ankara service another station located a few kilometres east of this station.

References

Railway stations in Ankara Province
Railway stations opened in 1892
Polatlı
1892 establishments in the Ottoman Empire